Jacobabad Tehsil is an administrative subdivision (tehsil) of Jacobabad District, Sindh, Pakistan. It is subdivided into 15 Union Councils, 8 of which comprise the capital Jacobabad

History
During British rule, the taluka was part of the Upper Sind Frontier District of the Bombay Presidency - the Imperial Gazetteer of India describes the taluka as follows:

References

Talukas of Sindh
Jacobabad District

See Also
 Jacobabad Junction railway station
 Jacobabad
 Jacobabad District